"Krazy" is the title of a 1994 top forty R&B and dance single by BlackGirl. It is also their first single. Larry Flick of Billboard referred to it as "engaging and chock full of pleasant harmonizing". A music video spent various weeks in the top-twenty of the BET network.

Track listing
 Krazy (Remixes) [CD Single]
1.) "Krazy" (Boss' Groove Mix w/ Rap) [4:19]
2.) "Krazy" (Krazy Original Radio Edit) [3:50]
3.) "Krazy" (Boss's Hip-Hop Mix) [4:15]
4.) "Krazy" (Krazy Party Mix) [4:12]
5.) "Krazy" (Boss' Groove Mix w/o Rap) [4:19]

Charts

References

1994 singles
1994 songs
RCA Records singles
BlackGirl songs